Márcia Fernandes Silva (born 29 May 1991) is a road cyclist from Brazil. She participated at the 2010 UCI Road World Championships and 2011 UCI Road World Championships.

On 2014 October 2014, Fernandes was suspended for two years for returning a positive doping test for EPO by the Brazilian Cycling Confederation.

Palmares
2009
 5th Copa América de Ciclismo 
2013
2nd Overall Grand Prix el Salvador

See also
List of doping cases in cycling

References

External links
 profile at Procyclingstats.com

1991 births
Brazilian female cyclists
Brazilian road racing cyclists
Living people
Place of birth missing (living people)
Brazilian sportspeople in doping cases
Doping cases in cycling
21st-century Brazilian women